The British Cadet Rifle Team, also known as The Athelings, are a team of eighteen cadets selected from the best cadet forces from throughout Britain. Every year applications are submitted in the Autumn term and a selection committee with twelve members choose the best eighteen applications, and name an additional three non-travelling reserves. These selected cadets then shoot the National Rifle Association Imperial Meeting in July before flying to Canada to compete with the Royal Canadian Army Cadets and shoot the Dominion of Canada meeting held at Connaught Cadet Training Centre.

Selection criteria
In order to gain selection for the Athelings, cadets must fit the following criteria as determined by the selection committee.

The cadet must have experience shooting in competition at Bisley
The level at which they compete must be very high
Must be under 18 years of age
They should have competed in at least one main NRA meeting in July
They should have an excellent cadet record
They must have accompanying references from their Headmaster or Cadet Unit Commander

History

The Athelings was started in 1910 when cadets from Australia, New Zealand and Canada came to shoot in England. This followed by subsequent exchanges that took place through the Imperial Cadet Association, founded in 1908 by Captain RJE Hanson. These early exchanges were well received and regular exchanges where started in 1928. This was also the period in which the term "Athelings" was introduced by Hanson to describe the members of the teams who go overseas to represent their country. The word is of Anglo Saxon origin and means "young noble".

Results

The results up to 2016 are as follows (Quoted from the official CCRS website)

Michael Faraday match:
Canadian Cadets 39 wins;
Athelings (UK) 33 wins

Alexander G Bell match:
Canadian Cadets 11 wins;
UK Cadets 52 wins

Rex Goddard match: 
Canadian Cadets 12 wins;
Athelings (UK) 17 wins (1993: no match)

References

External links
CCRS official site

Rifle shooting sports